Brock Vereen (born August 17, 1992) is a former American football safety. He was drafted by the Chicago Bears of the National Football League (NFL) in the fourth round of the 2014 NFL Draft. He has also played for the Minnesota Vikings and New England Patriots. He played college football at University of Minnesota.  He is currently doing broadcasting work on Big Ten Network on their onsite pre game show and on CBS Sports Network's That Other Pregame Show as a studio commentator.

High school career
Vereen attended Valencia High School in Santa Clarita, California, where he was a two-time All-CIF selection. He led his team to a 12-1 record in 2009. As a senior, he recorded 51 tackles, eight interceptions, two pass break-ups and one sack, while offensively, playing wide receiver, he caught 20 receptions for 474 yards and seven touchdowns. 

Vereen was also a standout track & field athlete at Valencia, where he posted a personal best-time of 10.89 seconds in the 100-meter dash and participated in the 4x100.

Regarded as a three-star recruit by Rivals.com, Vereen was rated as the 66th best cornerback prospect of his class. Scout.com considered Vereen a two-star recruit and ranked him as the No. 166 cornerback in the nation, while ESPN.com had him as the No. 57 cornerback.

College career
Vereen attended the University of Minnesota from 2010 to 2013. He played both safety and cornerback. As a true freshman in 2010, he appeared in nine games with four starts and recorded 10 total tackles. In 2011, he started all 12 games at cornerback, recording 67 tackles, one interception, one forced fumble and five pass break-ups. In 2012, he played in all 13 games, with seven starts at safety.  He recorded 64 tackles, nine pass break-ups and two interceptions. In 2013, as a senior, he started all 13 games at safety, recording 59 tackles, one forced fumble, one interception and six pass break-ups. He was named first-team All-Big Ten by the coaches.

Professional career

Pre-draft

Chicago Bears
Vereen was drafted in the fourth round (131st overall) of the 2014 NFL Draft by the Chicago Bears. He signed a 4-year deal with the Bears on May 12, 2014. Vereen and fellow draft class quarterback David Fales were the NFL's first two draft picks to agree to terms.  

He was released by the Bears on September 29, 2015.

Minnesota Vikings
Vereen was signed to the Minnesota Vikings practice squad on October 1, 2015 after being unclaimed on waivers. He was waived by the Vikings on November 13.

New England Patriots
The New England Patriots signed Vereen to their practice squad on November 18, 2015. On January 26, 2016, Vereen signed a futures contract with the New England Patriots.
The Patriots released Vereen.

Kansas City Chiefs
On August 17, 2016, Vereen was claimed off waivers by the Chiefs. On September 3, 2016, he was released by the Chiefs. The next day, he was signed to the Chiefs' practice squad. He was released from the practice squad two days later.

Personal life
His father, Henry Vereen, was a ninth round pick of the Tampa Bay Buccaneers in the 1979 NFL Draft, and played wide receiver in the Canadian Football League for the BC Lions in the early 1980s. Vereen is a first cousin once removed of stage actor and dancer Ben Vereen. His brother, Shane Vereen, was a second-round pick of the New England Patriots in the 2011 NFL Draft.

References

External links
Chicago Bears bio
Minnesota Golden Gophers bio

1992 births
Living people
Sportspeople from Santa Clarita, California
Players of American football from California
American football safeties
American football cornerbacks
Minnesota Golden Gophers football players
Chicago Bears players
Minnesota Vikings players
New England Patriots players
Kansas City Chiefs players
People from Valencia, Santa Clarita, California